The Politics of Yemen are in an uncertain state due to the Houthi takeover in Yemen. An armed group known as the Houthis or Ansar Allah seized control of the Northern Yemeni government and announced it would dissolve parliament, as well as install a "presidential council", "transitional national council", and "supreme revolutionary council" to govern the country for an interim period. However, the deposed president, Abdrabbuh Mansur Hadi, has declared he is still in office and is working to establish a rival government in Aden.

Prior to the coup, Yemen's politics nominally took place in a framework of a semi-presidential representative democratic republic, where the President of Yemen was the head of state, while the Prime Minister of Yemen, who was appointed by the President, was the head of government. Although it was notionally a multi-party system, in reality it was completely dominated by one party, the General People's Congress, and had been since unification. Executive power was exercised by the President and the Government. Legislative power was vested in both the Government and the House of Representatives. The Judiciary was theoretically independent, but in reality it was prone to interference from the executive branch.

Yemen was a republic with a bicameral legislature. Under the constitution, an elected president, an elected 301-seat House of Representatives, and an appointed 111-member Shura Council share power. The president is head of state, and the prime minister is head of government. The constitution provides that the president be elected by popular vote from at least two candidates endorsed by Parliament; the prime minister is appointed by the president. The presidential term of office is 7 years, and the parliamentary term of elected office is 6 years. Suffrage is universal over 18.

Political background
For hundreds of years Yemen was ruled by imams who had absolute powers on the political process in the country. The imams of Yemen and later the Kings of Yemen were religiously consecrated leaders belonging to the Zaidiyyah branch of Shia Islam. They established a blend of religious and secular rule in parts of Yemen from 897. Their imamate endured under varying circumstances until the republican revolution in 1962. Zaidiyyah theology differed from Ismailis or Twelver Shi'ites by stressing the presence of an active and visible imam as leader. This came to an end with the assassination of Imam Yehia. His son, Imam Badr succeeded him but the political situation deteriorated with the beginning of the North Yemen Civil War in 1962 with the overthrow of Imam Badr and the setting of a new, Republican regime.

While in the North, during the civil war, the pro-monarch and pro-republican forces fought for power, the South of Yemen was under British control. During the 1960s, the British sought to incorporate all of the Aden Protectorate territories into the Federation. On 18 January 1963, the Colony of Aden was incorporated against the wishes of much of the city's populace as the State of Aden and the Federation was renamed the Federation of South Arabia.  Several more states subsequently joined the Federation and the remaining states that declined to join, mainly in Hadhramaut, formed the Protectorate of South Arabia. In 1963 fighting between Egyptian forces and British-led Saudi-financed guerrillas in the Yemen Arab Republic spread to South Arabia with the formation of the National Liberation Front (NLF), who hoped to force the British out of South Arabia.  Hostilities started with a grenade attack by the NLF against the British High Commissioner on 10 December 1963, killing one person and injuring fifty, and a state of emergency was declared, becoming known as the Aden Emergency. In 1964, the new British government under Harold Wilson announced their intention to hand over power to the Federation of South Arabia in 1968, but that the British military would remain. In 1964, there were around 280 guerrilla attacks and over 500 in 1965.  In 1966  the British Government announced that all British forces would be withdrawn at independence.  In response, the security situation deteriorated with the creation of the socialist Front for the Liberation of Occupied South Yemen (FLOSY) which started to attack the NLF in a bid for power, as well as attacking the British. With the British being defeated and driven from Aden by the end of November 1967, earlier than had been planned by British Prime Minister Harold Wilson and without an agreement on the succeeding governance. Their enemies, the NLF, managed to seize power, with Aden itself under NLF control. The Royal Marines, who had been the first British troops to occupy Aden in 1839, were the last to leave.  The Federation of South Arabia collapsed and Southern Yemen became independent as the People's Republic of South Yemen.

Following this Yemen suffered from a highly fractured political landscape, which is the legacy of the regime of President Ali Abd Allah Saleh, who came to power in 1978 and formally resigned his office in February 2012.

Reunification
The Republic of Yemen (ROY) was declared on 22 May 1990 with Saleh becoming president and al-Baidh Vice President.  For the first time in centuries, much of Greater Yemen was politically united. A 30-month transitional period for completing the unification of the two political and economic systems was set. A presidential council was jointly elected by the 26-member YAR advisory council and the 17-member PDRY presidium. The presidential council appointed a Prime Minister, who formed a Cabinet. There was also a 301-seat provisional unified parliament, consisting of 159 members from the north, 111 members from the south, and 31 independent members appointed by the chairman of the council.

A unity constitution was agreed upon in May 1990 and ratified by the populace in May 1991. It affirmed Yemen's commitment to free elections, a multiparty political system, the right to own private property, equality under the law, and respect of basic human rights. Parliamentary elections were held on 27 April 1993. International groups assisted in the organization of the elections and observed actual balloting. The resulting Parliament included 143 GPC, 69 YSP, 63 Islaah (Yemeni grouping for reform, a party composed of various tribal and religious groups), six Baathis, three Nasserists, two Al Haq, and 15 independents. The head of Islaah, Paramount Hashid Sheik Abdallah Bin Husayn Al-Ahmar, was the speaker of Parliament.

In late 1991 through early 1992, deteriorating economic conditions led to significant domestic unrest, including several riots. Legislative elections were nonetheless held in early 1993, and in May the two former ruling parties, the GPC and the YSP, merged to create a single political party with an overall majority in the new House of Representatives. In August Vice President al Baydh exiled himself voluntarily to Aden, and the country's general security situation deteriorated as political rivals settled scores and tribal elements took advantage of the widespread unrest. In January 1994, representatives of the main political parties signed a document of pledge and accord in Amman, Jordan, that was designed to resolve the ongoing crisis. Despite this, clashes intensified until civil war broke out in early May 1994.

Yemeni uprising 

The 2011 Yemeni protests followed the initial stages of the Arab Spring and began simultaneously with the Egyptian Revolution. The protests were initially against unemployment, economic conditions and corruption, as well as against the government's proposals to modify the constitution of Yemen. The protestors' demands then escalated to calls for President Ali Abdullah Saleh to resign.

The situation however quickly deteriorated into a widescale uprising, with various insurgency campaigns consolidating into armed struggles, both between the armed opposition and terror groups vs. the government and among themselves. Eventually a Saudi-brokered agreement on Saleh's resignation and 2012 Presidential election saw the installation of Abd Rabbuh Mansur Hadi as an interim President. Hadi has been presiding over political reform and national reconciliation and was supposed to serve only two years in the post. In November 2013 U.N. envoy Jamal Benomar told The Associated Press Hadi will remain president after February 2014 because the transition is not likely to be completed earlier due to "obstruction" from former regime loyalists.

Houthi insurgency 

In northern Yemen, where a large Shi’a Zaydi population lives, Saleh's regime has for decades alienated this community through religious and political policies. Saleh, with the help of some elements in Saudi Arabia, had promoted strongly anti-Zaydi groups of Salafi Muslims in this region. Zaydis organized themselves politically in the early 2000s under the aegis of a family of religious scholars called the Houthis. They began by criticizing Saleh's pro-U.S. policies, which led to armed confrontation and a series of wars with the Yemeni army. This ultimately dragged the Saudi Arabian military into the fray, leading to considerable property destruction and a large refugee problem. In 2011, as Saleh's power waned in the provinces as a result of the uprising against him, the Houthis took control over large areas of the north, but still remain outside the political framework of government.

Executive branch 

Under the Constitution, the President is elected by direct, popular vote for a seven-year term. The vice-president, prime minister and deputy prime ministers are appointed by the President. The Council of Ministers is appointed by the President on the advice of the prime minister.

Leadership in Aden:

|Chairman of the Presidential Leadership Council
|Rashad al-Alimi
|General People's Congress
|7 April 2022
|-
|Prime Minister
|Maeen Abdulmalik Saeed
|General People's Congress
|15 October 2018
|}

Leadership in Sana'a:

|
|
|
|
|-
|
|
|
|
|}

Legislative branch 
The Assembly of Representatives (Majlis al-Nuwaab) has 301 members, elected for a six-year term in single-seat constituencies. In May 1997, the president created a Consultative Council, sometimes referred to as the upper house of Parliament; its 59 members are all appointed by the president. The president of the Consultative Council was Abdul Aziz Abdul Ghani prior to his death in August 2011.

Political parties and elections 

In April 2003 parliamentary elections, the General People's Congress (GPC) maintained an absolute majority. International observers described the elections as "another significant step forward on Yemen’s path toward democracy; however, sustained and forceful efforts must be undertaken to remedy critical flaws in the country’s election and political processes." There were some problems with underage voting, confiscation of ballot boxes, voter intimidation, and election-related violence; moreover, the political opposition in Yemen has little access to the media, since most outlets are owned or otherwise controlled by the government.

The 2006 elections were described in positive wording, and the elections were monitored by a number of international observers. The EU's Election Observation Mission to Yemen has published this final report on the elections:  Yemeni media reported on the 22.01.2007 that the opposition coalition JMP has set up a Shadow government "to play an effective role in the political, economic and social life". The ruling party GPC called upon the opposition to "acquaint themselves with constitutional systems before starting to talk every now and then about...rosy dreams and illusions".

Judicial branch 

The constitution calls for an independent judiciary. The former northern and southern legal codes have been unified. The legal system includes separate commercial courts and a Supreme Court based in Sanaá. The Quran is the basis for all laws, and no law may contradict it. Indeed, many court cases are debated by the religious basis of the laws i.e. by interpretations of the Quran. For this reason, many judges are religious scholars as well as legal authorities.

Administrative divisions 
Yemen is divided into 20 governorates (muhafazat, singular - muhafazah) and the capital city of Sana'a. The governorates are Abyan, 'Adan, Amran, Al Asimah, Al Bayda', Al Dhale'e, Al Hudaydah, Al Jawf, Al Mahrah, Al Mahwit, Dhamar, Hadhramawt, Hajjah, Ibb, Lahij, Ma'rib, Raymah, Sa'dah, Shabwah ('Ataq) and Ta'izz.

Provincial and local government 
Formal government authority is centralized in the capital city of Sanaa. Yemen's Local Authority Law decentralized authority by establishing locally elected district and governorate councils (last elected in September 2006), formerly headed by government-appointed governors. After the September 2006 local and governorate council elections, President Salih announced various measures that would enable future governors and directors of the councils to be directly elected. In May 2008, governors were elected for the first time. However, because the ruling party, the General People's Congress (GPC), continues to dominate the local and governorate councils, the May 2008 elections retained this party's executive authority over the governorates. In rural Yemen, direct state control is weak, with tribal confederations acting as autonomous sub-states.

See also 
 Foreign relations of Yemen
 Constitution of Yemen
 2011 Yemeni protests
 Al-Qaeda in the Arabian Peninsula (AQAP)
 State feminism (section: Yemen)

References

External links 
 Government of Yemen
 Unofficial website of the Parliament of Yemen

 

bn:ইয়েমেন#রাজনীতি